Turkey competed at the 1936 Summer Olympics in Berlin, Germany. 48 competitors, 46 men and 2 women, took part in 26 events in 7 sports. Turkey won its first-ever Olympic medals at these games.

Medalists

Basketball

First Round

First consolation round

Cycling

Four cyclists, all male, represented Turkey in 1936

Individual road race
 Kazım Bingen
 Kirkor Canbazyan
 Orhan Suda
 Talat Tunçalp

Team road race
 Kazım Bingen
 Kirkor Canbazyan
 Orhan Suda
 Talat Tunçalp

Equestrian

Fencing

Seven fencers, five men and two women, represented Turkey in 1936.

Men's sabre
 Enver Balkan
 Orhan Adaş
 Cihat Teğin

Men's team sabre
 Ilhami Çene, Enver Balkan, Cihat Teğin, Abdul Halim Tokmakçioğlu, Orhan Adaş

Women's foil
 Suat Aşani
 Halet Çambel

Football

Round of 16

Sailing

Wrestling

References

External links
Official Olympic Reports
International Olympic Committee results database

Nations at the 1936 Summer Olympics
1936
1936 in Turkish sport